The West Wind may refer to:

 The West Wind (newspaper), an American newspaper
 The West Wind (painting), a 1917 painting by Canadian painter Tom Thomson
 The West Wind (sculpture), a 1928-9 sculpture by Henry Moore

See also
 Ode to the West Wind, an 1819 poem by Percy Bysshe Shelley
 The West Wing
 West wind (disambiguation)